Arbor Lodge Park is a public park in north Portland, Oregon's Arbor Lodge neighborhood, in the United States. The  park was acquired in 1940.

See also
 List of parks in Portland, Oregon

References

External links
 
 

1940 establishments in Oregon
Arbor Lodge, Portland, Oregon
Parks in Portland, Oregon